Six Finger Satellite (a.k.a. 6FS) are an American synthesizer-based post-hardcore band, based in Providence, Rhode Island, United States.

History
The band formed in 1990 around a line-up of J. Ryan (singer/keyboards), John MacLean (guitar), Peter Phillips (guitar), Chris Dixon (bass), and Rick Pelletier (drums). They infamously submitted an "alternative rock"-styled demo to Sub Pop Records, who subsequently signed them under the impression that this represented the band's musical intentions. The demo was the four-song Weapon EP in 1992.

Six Finger Satellite's first full-length album, The Pigeon Is the Most Popular Bird, was released in 1993, with Kurt Niemand replacing Dixon on bass. The record more accurately represented the band's vision of noisy, cyborg-esque post-punk, and was recorded by Bob Weston, whose band Shellac named their 1994 single, The Bird is the Most Popular Finger in tribute. In 1994, 6FS released the Machine Cuisine EP, which was recorded entirely with synthesizers, suggesting the band's future direction. Their 7" single supposedly recorded "live at the A.C.I." was not actually recorded live at the Rhode Island Adult Correctional Institute prison, as purported in its tongue-in-cheek liner notes.

In the meantime, Phillips had left the band and Niemand had died of a drug overdose. James Apt (bass) joined for the 1995 album Severe Exposure, which represented a fusion of their synth- and guitar-driven sounds. It was during this time that the band began using their advance money from Sub Pop to buy recording equipment and build their own studio called The Parlour. Over the course of the next 3 years, the studio underwent a few physical renovations and upgrades in recording gear. The band became adept at recording and Ryan, Pelletier and MacLean were involved in recording projects with local Providence bands; Les Savy Fav, Astoveboat, Landed, Men's Recovery Project, flicker, The Olneyville Soundsystem, to name a few. The low-budget music video for the song "Parlour Games" from Severe Exposure (directed by Guy Benoit of Thee Hydrogen Terrors) was featured in an episode of Beavis and Butt-head.

Paranormalized was a quick follow-up to Severe Exposure, and while it continued in the same sonic vein, the album was decidedly less guitar focused, with more emphasis on layered synthesizers. The touring for this record was much more effective as the band played with Shellac, The Jesus Lizard, and Trans Am and was on the road for most of that year. A few of the songs became live set staples ("Slave Traitor", "The Greatest Hit").

The band's final full-length was Law of Ruins, released in 1998 and produced by James Murphy. It was marked by a spacier sound, and was heavily influenced by Krautrock. The CD came in an entirely clear jewelcase with minimalist neon green graphic design/writing. Murphy had joined as live sound engineer the previous year as the band was increasingly aware of the importance of having its own soundman. Murphy had been recording bands in Brooklyn at Plantain Studios and playing with the band Speedking. The 'death from above" moniker was one that Speedking had appropriated from a US military logo. The band and Murphy mutually influenced each other and the punishing live show took on another sonic dimension with Murphy at the board. MacLean quit the band in late 1998 soon after the release of "Law of Ruins" and was replaced by Alex Minoff from the band Golden for the few tours dates the band had committed to that year.  Minoff played live for a second short tour and then the band went on hiatus. In 1999, Ryan and Pelletier reformed the group, replacing Minoff and Apt with Joel Kyack (guitar) and Shawn Greenlee (bass) from the group Landed.  This incarnation of the group performed until 2001.

Reformation
The 2008 edition of Six Finger Satellite include longtime members J. Ryan and Rick Pelletier with Dan St. Jaques (Landed/Olneyville Sound System/Thee Hydrogen Terrors/Von Ryan's Express) on bass and Jon Loper (Made in Mexico/La Machine/Ghosts of Waco) on drums. The band announced that a previously unreleased album named Half Control, recorded in 2001, would be released on Load Records with new recording in the summer of 2008. A handful of live dates were announced with the new lineup.

The 2009 edition includes longtime members J. Ryan and Rick Pelletier with Dan St. Jacques and Brian Dufresne.

Influence
Six Finger Satellite attracted a significant underground following during the 1990s, and are today recognized for their somewhat prophetic fusion of electronic and post-punk music. In 2005, Jonathan Galkin remarked that "if a band came out today that sounded like Paranormalized, they'd be signed to a huge record deal, sight unseen." Similar bands that existed alongside 6FS in the 1990s included Trans Am, Brainiac, The V.S.S., and The Dismemberment Plan.

J. Ryan, his brother John Ryan, and Dan St. Jacques—Guy Benoit would come into the fold later—formed the spazzy, scuzzy, garage band Von Ryan's Express, named after the 1965 Frank Sinatra movie. He is commonly mistaken for the Chicago-based illustrator and poster artist of the same name. John MacLean has since recorded as The Juan Maclean and Rick Pelletier played in The Chinese Stars and plays in an ongoing dub-esque project called La Machine. James Murphy has gone on to form LCD Soundsystem and DFA Records. The label takes its name from his tour set-up for 6FS, which was known as "death from above."

Discography

Albums

EPs

Singles

Compilations
Revolution Come and Gone ("Weapon") (1992, Sub Pop)
Altered States of America ("Funny Like a Clown") (1993, Lime Lizard)
Curtis W. Pitts: Sub Pop Employee of the Month ("Funny Like a Clown") (1993, Sub Pop)
Say "Hello" to the Far East ("Solitary Hiro") (1993, Sub Pop Japan)
A Bitter Pill to Swallow: A Providence Music Sampler ("Whitepower") (1994, Over the Counter)
That Virtua Feeling: Sub Pop and Sega Get Together ("Parlour Games") (1995, Sub Pop)
Chicken Bomb ("Parlour Games" (live)) (1996, Boring Theoretical Productions)
Felidae: A Benefit for the Cedarhill Animal Sanctuary ("E.V. 635") (1997, Last Exit)
Spring Lineup: A Compilation of Sub Pop's Heavy Hitters ("Coke and Mirrors") (1997, Sub Pop)
The Money Shot! ("Fisher of Kings") (1997, Chunklet)
To All the URL's I've Loved ("Spooks / So Lonely") (1997, Sick & Tired)
untitled 7" with Carbon 14 magazine #9 ("Unit 6") (1997, Carbon 14)
Sound: Check ("Race Against Space") (1998, Sub Pop)
False Object Sensor ("The Pain Has Gone Away") (2001, Vermiform/X-Mist)

Other appearances
Fred Schneider - Just Fred (backing band on "Bad Dream") (1996, Warner Bros.)

References

External links
Myspace page
Sub Pop's old page on Six Finger Satellite
Sub Pop's new page
Trouser Press entry
[ 6FS at Allmusic]

American post-hardcore musical groups
Musical groups from Providence, Rhode Island
Rock music groups from Rhode Island
Load Records artists
Sub Pop artists